Alfred Hoppe (6 June 1830 – 15 April 1919) was an English amateur cricketer who played in two first-class cricket matches in the 1850s. He was born at Aldgate in Middlesex.

Hoppe made his first-class debut for Kent County Cricket Club, playing against a United England Eleven at Gravesend in 1854. His final appearance was for the Gentlemen of Kent and Sussex against the Gentlemen of England at Lord's in 1857. He played club cricket for Town Malling Cricket Club in Kent between 1849 and 1874.

Hoppe died at Cobham in Kent in April 1919 aged 88.

References

External links

1830 births
1919 deaths
People from the City of London
English cricketers
Kent cricketers
Gentlemen of Kent and Sussex cricketers